Patrick Nelson may refer to:

 Patrick Henry Nelson (1824–1864), Confederate States Army officer and militia general
 Patrick Henry Nelson II (1856–1914), lawyer and politician, son of the former
 Patrick Henry Nelson III (1910–1964), lawyer and politician, grandson of the former